Elater acutus is a species of click beetle in the family Elateridae.

References

Elateridae
Beetles described in 1863